Kodai is a 2023 Indian Tamil-language romantic comedy drama film directed by Raajaselvam and starring Karthick Singa and Anaya Lakshmi in the lead roles. The film's music is composed by Subash Kavi, while the cinematography is handled by Arjunan Karthick and editing is done by G. Sasikumar. It was released on 10 February 2023.

Cast

Production 
Vasan Karthik, the son of actor Singamuthu, who had earlier appeared in Maamadurai (2007) and Ayyan (2011), used the new stage name of Karthick Singa for Kodai.

Music 
The film's soundtrack and background score was composed by Subash Kavi.

Reception 
The film was released on 10 February 2023 across Tamil Nadu. A critic from The Hindu Tamil gave the film two out of five stars, concluding that it was "low on excitement". A reviewer from Dina Thanthi noted that the film had a good mix of all "romance, comedy and action". A critic from Thinaboomi also gave the film a negative review.

References

External links 
 
 2023 films
 2020s Tamil-language films